is a railway station on the Keihan Nakanoshima Line in Kita-ku, Osaka, Japan. It opened on October 19, 2008 (the day of the opening of the Nakanoshima Line).

Station layout
The station consists of an underground island platform serving two tracks.

Surroundings
Naniwa Bridge
Kitahama Station (Keihan Main Line, Osaka Municipal Subway Sakaisuji Line)
Nakanoshima Park
Osaka Prefectural Nakanoshima Library
The Museum of Oriental Ceramics, Osaka
Osaka Central Public Hall
Temma-Tenjin Hanjotei
Osaka High Court, Osaka District Court, Osaka Summary Court
Osaka Bar Association

Adjacent stations

Nakanoshima
Railway stations in Japan opened in 2008
Railway stations in Osaka Prefecture
Stations of Keihan Electric Railway